Shoeshine (from Neapolitan pronunciation of the English) is a 1946 Italian film directed by Vittorio De Sica. Sometimes regarded as his first masterpiece, the film follows two shoeshine boys who get into trouble with the police after trying to find the money to buy a horse.

Plot

Two friends, Giuseppe Filippucci and Pasquale Maggi, test-ride horses. Though they are saving to purchase a horse, it is difficult for them to afford one, as they are only living off their income from shining shoes in the streets of Rome.

One day Giuseppe's older brother, Attilio, visits the boys and tells them that Panza (a fence) has some work for them. Pasquale brings Giuseppe along to meet Panza, who gives them two blankets to sell. Giuseppe and Pasquale take the blankets to a fortune teller, who buys them. After the sale, Panza, Attilio, and another man burst into the fortune teller's house, posing as policemen. They accuse the fortune teller of handling stolen goods, and finding Giuseppe and Pasquale, force them out and pretend to take them into custody. Attilio tells the boys to go away and keep quiet, letting them keep the blanket money (2,800 lira) as well as 3,000 additional lira. With this money, the boys have enough to finally buy a horse.

After purchasing their horse and riding it, the boys return to the city. There the real police, accompanied by the fortune teller, bring them into the precinct for questioning. The police accuse the boys of stealing 700,000 lira from the fortune teller's home, which obviously was stolen by Panza and Attilio, posing as the policemen. The boys deny all charges and do not mention their knowledge of the three true con men. Giuseppe and Pasquale are sent to a juvenile detention center. On arrival, Giuseppe and Pasquale are separated.

The con men send Giuseppe a parcel filled with food and he shares it with his fellow inmates in his own cell. Another inmate, Arcangeli, finds a note in a piece of the bread Giuseppe shares. It is from Attilio's boss, and it instructs him not to expose his brother and comrades regarding the con. Giuseppe informs Pasquale; they agree not to divulge the truth.

Later, the boys are called into the police chief's office for questioning. Frustrated, the chief threatens to beat the information out of them. Another policeman takes Giuseppe into a side room to beat him. Hidden from Pasquale's view, Giuseppe is taken back to his cell, while another child poses as Giuseppe's screaming voice. The policeman proceeds to flay a sandbag, while the child belts out false screams. Pasquale, thinking his friend was in unbearable pain, finally admits the names of Panza and Attilio to the police chief.

Giuseppe discovers that Pasquale confessed when his mother visits him and reveals that Attilio, his brother, has been informed. Giuseppe confronts Pasquale in front of the other inmates, calling him a spy.

A file is planted in Pasquale's cell, and Pasquale is flogged. At their official court hearing, Giuseppe and Pasquale are respectively sentenced to one and two years in prison. Giuseppe commits to Arcangeli's escape plan. While a movie is being projected in prison, they escape.

Pasquale tells the police chief where the escapees went and leads them there, but they have already escaped. Pasquale runs off and finds Giuseppe and Arcangeli riding on their horse across a bridge. They dismount, and Arcangeli flees, but Giuseppe stays. Pasquale takes off his belt and starts to flog Giuseppe. Giuseppe falls off the bridge and hits his head on the rocks below. Pasquale cries over his fallen friend's body as the police arrive and the horse trots off.

Cast
 Franco Interlenghi	as  Pasquale Maggi
 Rinaldo Smordoni		as  Giuseppe Filippucci
 Annielo Mele		as  Raffaele
 Bruno Ortenzi		as  Arcangeli
 Emilio Cigoli		as  Staffera
 Maria Campi 		as  Palmist (uncredited)

Legacy
Shoeshine is one of the early Italian neorealist films. In 1948, it received an Honorary Award at the Academy Awards for its high quality. This award was the precursor of what would later become the Academy Award for Best Foreign Language Film.

Pauline Kael, writing in a review published in 1961, commented: "Life, as Shoeshine demonstrates, is too complex for facile endings. Shoeshine was not conceived in the patterns of romance or melodrama; it is one of those rare works of art which seem to emerge from the welter of human experience without smoothing away the raw edges, or losing what most movies lose — the sense of confusion and accident in human affairs...The greatness of Shoeshine is in that feeling we get of human emotions that have not been worked-over and worked-into something (a pattern? a structure?) and cannot really be comprised in such a structure. We receive something more naked, something that pours out of the screen...Shoeshine has a sweetness and a simplicity that suggest greatness of feeling, and this is so rare in film works that to cite a comparison one searches beyond the medium — if Mozart had written an opera set in poverty, it might have had this kind of painful beauty...This tragic study of the corruption of innocence is intense, compassionate, and above all, humane."

Orson Welles said of Shoeshine: "What De Sica can do, that I can’t do. I ran his Shoeshine again recently and the camera disappeared, the screen disappeared; it was just life.”

The film inspired the comic book series Sciuscià, which ran from 1949 to 1956.

References

External links

 An essay by Bert Cardullo on Shoeshine

1946 films
1946 crime drama films
Italian neorealist films
Italian coming-of-age films
Italian crime drama films
1940s Italian-language films
Italian black-and-white films
Italian prison films
Films set in Rome
Best Foreign Language Film Academy Award winners
Films directed by Vittorio De Sica
Films with screenplays by Cesare Zavattini
Films awarded an Academy Honorary Award
Films scored by Alessandro Cicognini
1940s Italian films